Akrosida is a genus in the tribe Malveae, of the plant family Malvaceae.

Species
The genus, consists of two species: 
Akrosida floribunda —  endemic to the Dominican Republic.
Akrosida macrophylla — endemic to Brazil.

Both species have very limited distributions.

References

Malveae
Malvaceae genera